Coșernița is a village in Florești District, Moldova.

Notable people
 Alexandru Leșco

References

Villages of Florești District